The Suzuki GSX-S1000 is a standard motorcycle made by Japanese automotive manufacturer Suzuki. The GSX-S1000 debuted in 2015 in Japan and shares the same engine with the 2005-2008 GSX-R1000 with modifications and retuning for lower-end RPM torque for commuting and cruising at slower speeds.

The GSX-S1000 is also available in faired version called GSX-S1000GT (previously called GSX-S1000F), putting more emphasis on sport touring category as well as rivaling other naked liter-bike-derived sports tourer such as Kawasaki Ninja 1000 (faired variant of Kawasaki Z1000 respectively).

2017 Update 
Suzuki updated the GSX-S1000 in 2017, increasing the engine power to 150 bhp and torque to 79.6 ft⋅lbf at 9,500 rpm. It was fitted with a slipper clutch and has cosmetic changes such as black levers and foot pegs/controls. The GSX-S1000F variant  gained the same changes and also a tinted screen.

2021 Update 

Suzuki updated the GSX-S1000 for 2021, in Europe first and in other markets for the 2022 model year. Peak horsepower increased to
Externally, the bike has changed quite a bit, with an aggressive fighter jet-like vertical headlight design and cleaner look overall.

References

External links 

 
 GSX-S1000 (2015-2020) review
 GSX-S1000F (2015-2020) review
GSX-S1000 (2021-on) review

GSX-S1000
Standard motorcycles
Motorcycles introduced in 2015